Bradley County is a county located in the southeastern portion of the U.S. state of Tennessee. As of the 2020 census, the population was 108,620, making it the thirteenth most populous county in Tennessee. Its county seat is Cleveland. It is named for Colonel Edward Bradley of Shelby County, Tennessee, who was colonel of Hale's Regiment in the American Revolution and the 15th Regiment of the Tennessee Volunteers in the War of 1812. Bradley County is included in the Cleveland, Tennessee Metropolitan Statistical Area, which is also included in the Chattanooga-Cleveland-Dalton, TN-GA-AL Combined Statistical Area.

History

Indigenous peoples occupied this territory, especially along the waterways, for thousands of years before European contact. The first Europeans to see this area were likely Hernando De Soto and his expedition on June 2, 1540, while traveling through the Southeast interior of the North American continent. They encountered peoples of the South Appalachian Mississippian culture.

The historic Muscogee Creek and Yuchi occupied areas of what became Tennessee. The Yuchi town of Chestowee was located on the south bank of the lower Hiwassee River. They later moved from Tennessee into Georgia and South Carolina under pressure from the Cherokee, who were rising to power in the region. Cherokee warriors from the Middle Towns destroyed Chestowee in 1714, encouraged by English fur traders from South Carolina. Archeological surveys suggest that Chestowee was located at what is known as the Rymer archeological site, identified in later studies as within the European-American J.P. Rymer farm.

The Cherokee became predominant in this area and referred to a large region in present-day Bradley County as Chatata, meaning "clear water". The Yuchi, while speaking a different language, allied with the Muscogee Creek when moving into their territory in Georgia and Alabama.

In anticipation of forced removal of the Cherokee by treaty cession in this area north of the Hiwassee River, white settlers began to move here. In 1821, the Cherokee Agency, the official liaison between the U.S. Government and the Cherokee Nation, was moved to present-day Charleston, Tennessee. Between 1832 and 1838, the Cherokee moved their capital to the Red Clay Council Grounds, on the southern border of Bradley County with Georgia; it served as the Cherokee capital and the last council grounds of the Cherokee Nation-East. This property is now a state park, Red Clay State Park.

The Cherokee Removal began after some of their leaders signed the Treaty of New Echota, signed on December 29, 1835. The government had earlier tried to persuade them to move to Indian Territory; these leaders signed the treaty while trying to gain the best conditions for their people, as they believed it was inevitable.

General Winfield Scott was directed to remove the Cherokee from the Southeast, and set up the headquarters at Fort Cass in Charleston. Several internment camps were established in Bradley County in the valleys between Charleston and Cleveland, Tennessee, where the Cherokee were held in preparation for the journey westward. This became known as the Trail of Tears. Two of the largest internment camps were located at Rattlesnake Springs.

European-American development of Bradley County
Bradley County was established by the legislature on February 10, 1836. It was named to honor Colonel Edward Bradley who served in the War of 1812. The first election in Bradley County took place on April 2, 1836. On May 2, 1836, the location for the county seat of Cleveland was chosen. On January 20, 1838, Cleveland, which had a population of 400, was formally recognized by the state legislature as the seat of Bradley County. Cleveland was incorporated on February 2, 1842.

Like most East Tennessee counties, the voters of Bradley County were largely opposed to secession on the eve of the Civil War. In Tennessee's Ordinance of Secession referendum on June 8, 1861, the county's residents voted against secession -  1,382 to 507. No major battles were fought in Bradley County, but several major skirmishes between Union and Confederate troops took place there. In 1864, Confederate soldiers failed in an attempt to destroy a Union train near the Tasso community, an effort that resulted in destroying a Confederate train instead.

The bridge over the Hiwassee River was burned on November 8, 1861, by members of the East Tennessee bridge-burning conspiracy led by Alfred Cate. On November 4, 1862, a train accident south of Cleveland near the Black Fox community killed 17 members of the 33rd Regiment Alabama Infantry, who were being transported to Chattanooga. Union soldiers under the command of William Tecumseh Sherman camped at Cleveland, Tasso, and Blue Springs on multiple occasions during the latter half of the war. The city of Cleveland was occupied by the Confederate Army from 1861 to 1863.

Geography
The county is situated on a series of paralleling ridges running north-northeasterly which are part of the Ridge and Valley Appalachians. The highest of these, Candies Creek Ridge, runs through the center of Cleveland. Located in between these ridges are creeks, and there are several springs in the county, which made the area favorable to early settlers. The highest point in the county is located on the Hamilton County line along White Oak Mountain. The county is bordered on the north by the Hiwassee River. The majority of the county is located in the Tennessee Valley drainage basin, except for approximately the southeastern third, which is located in the Mobile Bay Watershed and contains the Conasauga River. This river is the only river in Tennessee that is not part of the Mississippi River Watershed.

Adjacent counties
Meigs County (northwest)
McMinn County (north)
Polk County (east)
Murray County, Georgia (southeast)
Whitfield County, Georgia (south)
Hamilton County (west)

State protected areas
Chickamauga Wildlife Management Area (part)
Charlotte Anne Finnell Neal Wildlife Management Area
Red Clay State Park

Demographics

2020 census

As of the 2020 United States census, there were 108,620 people, 39,992 households, and 26,516 families residing in the county.

2010 census
As of the census of 2010, there were 98,963 people, 37,947 households, and 26,867 families residing in the county. The population density was 298.98 persons per square mile. There were 41,395 housing units at an average density of 125.06 per square mile. The racial makeup of the county was 92.10% White, 4.27% Black or African American, 0.33% Native American, 0.86% Asian, 0.06% Native Hawaiian or Pacific Islander, and 1.45% from two or more races. Hispanics or Latinos (of any race) were 4.71% of the population. The largest ancestral groups were Irish 14.27%, German 12.62%, English 8.91%, Italian 2.39%, and Dutch 2.18%. An estimated 3.90% of the population was foreign-born, and an estimated 7.54% were veterans.

Of all of the households, 29.07% had children under the age of 18 living in them, 53.58% were married couples living together, 4.78% had a male householder with no wife present, 12.44% had a female householder with no husband present, and 29.2% were non-family households, with 23.8% of householders living alone. 33.27% of all households had individuals under the age of 18 living in them, and 26.36% had individuals aged 65 and older living in them. The average household size was 2.54 persons, and the average family size was 2.98 persons.

The population was spread out, with 22.97% under the age of 18, 62.88% ages 18 to 64, and 14.15% over the age of 65. The median age was 37.9 years. 51.32% of the population was female and 48.68% was male.

The median household income was $40,032, and the average per capita income was approximately $21,444. Males had a median income of $37,735 versus $28,585 for females. Approximately 11.6% of families and 16.0% of the population were below the poverty line, including 20.2% of those under the age of 18 and 10.8% of those age 65 or over.

Economy 
With thirteen Fortune 500 manufacturers, Cleveland has the fifth largest industrial economy in Tennessee. Cleveland is home to a variety of industries, including household cooking equipment, foodstuff, textiles, furniture, storage batteries, pharmaceuticals, industrial cleaning products, photographic processing, industrial and domestic chemicals, and automotive parts. Major employers include Whirlpool, Johnston Coca-Cola, Mars, Incorporated, Procter & Gamble, Duracell, Hardwick Clothes, and Cleveland Chair Company. Wacker Polysilicon, Olin Corporation, Amazon, and Arch Chemicals have factories and distribution centers in Charleston. Resolute Forest Products, formerly Bowater, has a plant across the river from Charleston in Calhoun.

Agriculture in Bradley County has an annual market value of over $105 million. Bradley County ranks second in the state for the production of poultry and broilers, most of which is raised in the southern half of the county. Bradley County is also home to farms which raise beef cattle, dairy, and crops, such as corn, soybeans, and fruits and vegetables.

Government

Bradley County has a 14-member county commission form of government, with two commissioners from each of seven districts. The commission is headed by a chairman and vice chairman, who are chosen by fellow commissioners. The current chairman is Tom Crye from District 2 and the current vice chairman is Bill Winters from District 7. Each district is also assigned a constable, also elected. The county executive (or "county mayor") separately elected, is Republican D. Gary Davis. Other elected officials include county clerk, circuit and criminal court clerk, register of deeds, assessor of property, trustee, and road superintendent. Elections take place every even year, with primaries in the first week of May and general elections in the first week of August, along with the state primary.

Bradley County is located in Tennessee's 3rd congressional district, represented by Republican Chuck Fleischmann. For the Tennessee House of Representatives, Bradley County is part of both District 22, represented by Republican Dan Howell, and District 24, represented by Republican Kevin Raper. Bradley County is represented in the Tennessee Senate, by Republican Dr. J. Adam Lowe

Cleveland and Bradley County have always been majority-Republican, as has most of East Tennessee, even when Tennessee was part of the Solid South. Since the Republican Party's founding, only two Democratic Presidential Candidates have won Bradley County; Woodrow Wilson in 1912 and Franklin Delano Roosevelt in 1936.
In both the 2000 and 2004 Presidential elections, the Republican candidate received the highest percentage of the popular vote in Bradley County out of all of Tennessee's counties.

Infrastructure

Transportation

Air
Hardwick Field, also known as Cleveland Municipal Airport, was the county's principal airport from 1955 to 2013. Cleveland Regional Jetport, located approximately two miles east of Hardwick Field opened on January 25, 2013, replacing Hardwick Field. It consists of a  runway.

Rail
The county is served by the Norfolk Southern Railway, which forks in Cleveland and provides logistics for industries.

Highways
Interstate 75 traverses the county from the southwest to the north, passing through the western edge of Cleveland. There are four exits on I-75 in Bradley County: three in Cleveland and one in Charleston. U.S. Route 11 and U.S. Route 64 intersect in downtown Cleveland. U.S. 11 connects to Chattanooga to the southwest and Athens to the north. U.S. 64 connects to Murphy, North Carolina to the east. S.R. 60 connects Cleveland to Dayton to the northwest and Dalton, Georgia to the south. APD-40, made up of the U.S. 64 Bypass and a section of S.R. 60 forms a beltway and bypass route around the business district of Cleveland. The U.S. 11 Bypass bypasses downtown Cleveland to the west.

Principal highways 

 Interstate 75
 U.S. Route 11
 U.S. Route 11 Bypass
 U.S. Route 64
 U.S. Route 64 Bypass
 U.S. Route 74
 S.R. 60
 S.R. 40
 S.R. 2
 S.R. 311
Paul Huff Parkway

Secondary highways 
 S.R. 74
 S.R. 306
 S.R. 308
 S.R. 312
 S.R. 313
 S.R. 317

Utilities
Cleveland Utilities is a city-owned corporation which provides electricity, water, and sewer service to the city of Cleveland and surrounding areas. The Calhoun-Charleston Utilities District provides water to Charleston. Volunteer Electric Cooperative (VEC) provides electricity to Charleston and the rest of Bradley County, except for a small portion in the southwestern part of the county along U.S. 11/64, including McDonald, which receives its electricity from Chattanooga-based EPB. The rest of the county is provided water by the Hiwassee Utilities Commission, Ocoee Utility District, Eastside Utility District, and Savannah Valley Utility District. Cleveland Utilities, VEC, and EPB all purchase their power from the Tennessee Valley Authority (TVA), which also provides power directly to heavy industries Olin, United Hydrogen, and Wacker. Chattanooga Gas, a subsidiary of Southern Company, provides natural gas to Cleveland and surrounding areas.

Healthcare
Prior to 2008, the county's two main hospitals were Bradley Memorial Hospital and Cleveland Community Hospital. They ran independently until 2008 when they were both purchased by SkyRidge Medical Center. In 2015, the two hospitals were purchased by Tennova Healthcare. Bradley Healthcare & Rehabilitation Center is a nursing home that serves the county. Bradley County Emergency Medical Services is an emergency medical service (EMS) agency of the county government that was established in 1972 and consists of six stations, eight ambulances, and two ancillary vehicles, along with more than 60 full-time employees and more than 25 part-time employees.

Education
Cleveland State Community College and Lee University are located in Bradley County. Public schools in the county are managed by the Bradley County Schools school district or the Cleveland City Schools school district. The county district has four public high schools: Bradley Central High School, Walker Valley High School, GOAL Academy, and REACH Adult High school. Cleveland High School is operated by the city school district. There is one State-accredited private Christian college preparatory school: Tennessee Christian Preparatory School.

Private schools 
Tennessee Christian Preparatory School
Cleveland Christian School
Bowman Hills Adventist School
Shenandoah Baptist Academy
United Christian Academy
Vanguard Christian Academy
Bachman Academy

Higher education 
Lee University
Cleveland State Community College
Pentecostal Theological Seminary

Media

Newspapers 
The Cleveland Daily Banner is the county's primary newspaper. The paper was first published in 1854, making it one of the oldest in the state. Additionally,  the Chattanooga Times Free Press, a paper based in Chattanooga, also serves as a primary source of news for Bradley County residents.

Radio 
Several radio stations located within Chattanooga and neighboring cities serve Bradley County, along with others licensed to Cleveland, which are listed below:

Television 
Bradley County is served by several TV stations licensed both in the county and in neighboring counties. Stations licensed in Cleveland include:

Communities

Cities
Cleveland (county seat)
Charleston

Census-designated places
 East Cleveland
 Hopewell
 McDonald
 South Cleveland
 Wildwood Lake

Unincorporated communities
 Georgetown
 Misty Ridge
 Prospect
 Tasso
 Waterville

See also
Chatata
National Register of Historic Places listings in Bradley County, Tennessee
Red Clay State Park

References

Notes

External links

 Official site
 Bradley County Sheriff's Office
 Cleveland-Bradley Chamber of Commerce
 Bradley County on FamilySearch Wiki – genealogical resources
TNGenweb

 
1836 establishments in Tennessee
Populated places established in 1836
Cleveland metropolitan area, Tennessee
Counties of Appalachia
East Tennessee